Sir Adam Newton, 1st Baronet (died 1630) was a Scottish scholar, royal tutor, dean of Durham and baronet.

Life

He spent part of his early life in France, passing himself off as a priest and teaching at the college of St. Maixant in Poitou. There, for some time between 1580 and 1590, he instructed the future theologian André Rivet in Greek. After his return to Scotland he was, about 1600, appointed tutor to Prince Henry at Stirling Castle. In 1602 he bought books for the prince from Andro Hart in Edinburgh.

After the Union of Crowns he came to England, and was naturalized as an English citizen in James's first English parliament. In 1605 he obtained the deanery of Durham through royal influence, although he was not in orders, and was installed by proxy. The duties of the office must also have been done by proxy, if at all. In 1606 he acquired the manor of Charlton, Kent, where he built Charlton House.

Robert Cecil, 1st Earl of Salisbury wrote humorous letters to Newton. Apologising for a breach of manners, he compared himself to the court jester Tom Durie. In another letter to Newton he wrote that if a certain man failed to gain a place in Prince Henry's household, he should be sent to "Tom Dyrry or to me". The applicant was poor but could become rich by charging a fee to all the girls in England who wished to meet the Prince.

He continued as tutor to Prince Henry until 1610, when, upon the formation of a separate household for his pupil, now created Prince of Wales, he was appointed his secretary. After the death of Prince Henry, in 1612, Newton became receiver-general, or treasurer in the household of Prince Charles, relinquishing to Thomas Murray his claim to the secretaryship. He retained his post until his death. In 1620 he was made a baronet, first selling the deanery of Durham to Dr. Richard Hunt, and presumably paying for his new honour with the proceeds. After Charles's accession Newton became secretary to the council, and in 1628 secretary to the marches of Wales, the reversion of which office had been granted to him as early as 1611; it was worth £2,000 year.

He died 13 January 1630. His executors David Cunningham of Auchenharvie and Peter Newton were instructed to use a legacy to rebuild the nearby St Luke's Church, Charlton.

Works
Newton translated into Latin King James's Discourse against Vorstius and books i-vi. of Paolo Sarpi's History of the Council of Trent, which had been published in 1620 in London in an English version made from the Italian original by Sir Nathaniel Brent. Newton's translation was published anonymously in London in 1620. Thomas Smith complimented the work and man in his Vita quorumdam Eruditissimorum Virorum.

Family

In June 1605 Newton married Katherine Puckering, youngest daughter of Sir John Puckering, lord-keeper of the great seal in the reign of Elizabeth, whose son Thomas Puckering shared the prince's studies under Newton's guidance. King James gave them a gift of silver gilt plate supplied by the London goldsmith John Williams. Elizabeth Newton died in 1618. Their children included:
 Henry Newton, who adopted his mother's surname, and became Sir Henry Puckering, 3rd Baronet, after inheriting his uncle Thomas Puckering's estates and titles in 1654.
 Elizabeth Newton, who married Edward Peyto in 1625
 Jane Newton, who married James Enyon

Notes

References

Year of birth missing
16th-century Scottish people
17th-century Scottish people
Court of James VI and I
1630 deaths
Scottish translators
Deans of Durham
Baronets in the Baronetage of England
People of Stirling Castle